A valve is a device that regulates the flow of fluids.

Valve may also refer to:

Mechanical and electrical

 Brass instrument valve, for valves used in brass instruments
 Rotary valve, a valve using an internal rotor to select flow paths
 Piston valve, a valve using a piston to control fluid flow
 Piston valve (steam engine), a piston valve as used in steam engines
 Poppet valve, a valve consisting of a hole and a tapered plug on the end of a shaft, typically used in instruments, engines, etc.
 Vacuum tube, also called "thermionic valve", an electronic component
 Mercury-arc valve, a type of electrical rectifier tube

Biology
 Heart valve, valves in the heart that maintain the unidirectional flow of blood
 Vein valve, valves in veins and other fluid cords in body
 Lymphatic valve, valves in lymphatic vessels
 Valve (mollusc), the shell of a mollusc
 Valve (diatoms), the siliceous unit that makes up one half of a diatom cell
 Valve (botany), part produced by the splitting of a capsule or pod when ripe
 Valve, a paired clasping process on the genitalia of male moths

Companies
 Valve Corporation (also known as Valve Software or Valve), a video game developer and digital distribution company
 Valve Records, an Australian record label
 Valve Amplification Company, a U.S. high end audio electronics company

People
Valve (given name), an Estonian feminine given name

Other uses
 Valve hall, a building which contains the valves of the static inverters of a high-voltage direct current plant
 The Valves, UK band

See also

Valve amplifier (tube amplifier)
 Valve audio amplifier
 Valve RF amplifier
Valve gear
Valve train
Valveless
Valvetronic